Justine Chelsea "J. C." Brandy (born 15 November 1975) is a British-born American actress.

Early life
Brandy is an actress, songwriter, director, and acting coach. She was born in London but grew up in New York City, where she attended Fiorello H. LaGuardia High School of Music & Art and Performing Arts as a drama major. She later went on to study at The London Academy of Dramatic Arts.  She received additional instruction from Larry Moss, Anthony Abeson, The Neighborhood Playhouse, Patsy Rodenburg (Shakespeare), The Upright Citizens Brigade, Joanna Gleason (Musical Theatre), and Jean Louis Rodriguez (Alexander Technique).

Career
Brandy is a critically acclaimed actress. She booked her first job at the age of 18 as a series regular on the CBS series Wolf. She has been cast in over a dozen films, studio and independent, a multitude of television shows, and many roles in regional theatre. Her credits include Star Trek: The Next Generation, CSI: Crime Scene Investigation, Strong Medicine, Silk Stalkings, Days of Our Lives, Boomtown, McBride: The Chameleon Murder, Halloween: The Curse of Michael Myers (as Jamie Lloyd), What Lies Beneath, and Strong Medicine. She was awarded Best Actress at the Festival International de Biarritz for her performance in the independent film God’s Helper. Brandy is also a songwriter and guitarist for the all-female band Lo-Ball and has penned songs on the soundtracks of Legally Blonde and What Lies Beneath. She is a trained theater actress, and starred in Lewis Black's One Slight Hitch at the Falcon Theater in 1994. Other notable stage performances include Marlene in Top Girls and Velma in Hairspray.  Brandy is also an acting teacher, coach and director.

Filmography

Wolf (1989–1990, TV Series) – Angeline Bacarri
Coconut Downs (1991, TV Movie) – Cindy
Runaway Father (1991, TV Movie) – Andrea
Star Trek: The Next Generation (1993, TV Series) – Ensign Marta Batanides
I'm the Elephant, U Are the Mouse (1994) – Alice
Menendez: A Killing in Beverly Hills (1994, TV Movie) – Jackie Hayes
Murder, She Wrote (1995, TV Series) – Louise Henderson
Halloween: The Curse of Michael Myers (1995) – Jamie Lloyd
Kindred: The Embraced (1996, TV Series) – Riannon
Hollywood Safari (1997) – Samantha
Dogstar (1997) – Gabrielle
Devil in the Flesh (1998) – Janie Magray
Silk Stalkings (1992–1998, TV Series) – Nicole 'Nikki' Spencer / Kelly Henderson / Nicole Gaines
Lucinda's Spell (1998) – Betsy
What Lies Beneath (2000) – Band Member (uncredited)
Bar Hopping (2000, TV Movie) – Aerosmith
God's Helper (2001, Short) – Reanne
Strong Medicine (2001, TV Series) – Molly Harris
Prometheus Bound (2002) – Kathleen
Boomtown (2003, TV Series) – Chandler
Asleep at the Wheel on the Road to Nowhere (2004, Short) – Ai
CSI: Crime Scene Investigation (2004, TV Series) – Nicole 'Raven' Richards
McBride: The Chameleon Murder (2005, TV Movie) – Chelsea Robertson
Days of Our Lives (2005, TV Series) – Marguerite
Comedy Hell (2006) – Tina
Love's Unfolding Dream (2007, TV Movie) – Caroline
Prank (2008) – Female cop
Zimm (2009, TV Series) – Dr. Rubye Lee
Femme Fatales (2011, TV Series) – Maxine
The Victim (2011) – Missing Girl
333 (2012)

References

External links

1975 births
English film actresses
English rock guitarists
English women guitarists
English songwriters
English television actresses
Fiorello H. LaGuardia High School alumni
Living people
People from Chelsea, London
21st-century British guitarists
British expatriate actresses in the United States
21st-century English women
21st-century English people
21st-century women guitarists